The Namibian Marines Corps is the Naval Infantry of Namibia and is part of the Namibian Navy and the Namibian Defence Force.

History
The Marine Corps are a recent addition to the Namibian Defence Force due to the gradual establishment of the Namibian Navy. The first Marines were trained in Brazil in 2005. The Marine Commandant is subordinate to the Commander of the Namibian Navy. The current Marine Corps Commandant is Captain Olavi Shipunda.

Training
Aspirant Marines are trained in Namibia by a combination of Namibian instructors as well as the Brazilian Military Advisory Team (BRAZMATT) based in Walvis Bay at the Naval Training School. The first course to complete before induction as a marine is the Marines Soldier Formation Course that lasts for five months, after completion induction into the marine corps takes place and the marine is promoted to the rank of able seaman. Marines specializing in infantry are required complete a six-month infantry specialization course. The Marine Amphibious Commandos Special Operations Course is the toughest course in the corps and has a one-in-two failure rate; its courses last a year.

Force Structure
During its infancy Navy Chief of Naval Support indicated that the short-term goal was to have a force consisting of Marine Corps Infantry Company, Service Support Company, Provost Company and Brass Band. However due operation requirements, a Marine Battalion with own organic rapid Reaction, Operational Boats Unit and Operational Diving teams is envisioned.

Rapid Reaction Force
Marine Corps Infantry Battalion
Service Support Company
Provost Company
Brass Band
Amphibious Special Operations Unit
Operational Boats Unit
Operational Diving Team

Rapid Reaction Force

A Light infantry unit responsible for protection of static, forward and naval bases.

Marine Corps Infantry Battalion
The Marine Corps Infantry Battalion is the unit responsible for undertaking armed marine operations. A full marine battalion has been raised initially from a single company.

Service Support Company
Service support company provides direct and indirect sustainment services to the Marine Battalion as it conducts operations.
Support service offered by the sub-unit includes but not limited to:
Quartermaster 
Finance
Medical
Transportation

Provost Company
The provost company is responsible for the policing of Navy service personnel.

Brass Band
The performs musical duties for military functions and any other apolitical functions for the general public. The band emulates the United States Marine Drum and Bugle Corps and the 5 bands of the Royal Marines Band Service. The Brass Band performs at many important events every year, ant is considered and integral state funerals, state arrival ceremonies, state dinners, parades, and other social events. Although it is a naval band in the Namibian Navy, it is a separate unit from the navy's flagship ensemble, the Namibian Navy Band.

Amphibious Commandos Unit
Provides Amphibious Special Operations capability to the Navy.

Operational Boat Unit
Conducts small boat patrols particularity in the riverine area's of the Zambezi Region's Zambezi River and Chobe River.

Operational Diving Unit
It is a clearance diving unit that specializes in the disposal of hazardous materials. Its role varies depending on the situation, with duties ranging from counter terrorism to explosive ordnance disposal.

Deployments
Marines Corps infantry are deployed on Namibian Navy vessels and shore installations.

Marine Corps equipment

Rifles

Submachine-guns

Machine-guns

Grenades and Grenade Launchers

Anti-Tank Weapons

Vehicles
 RG-32 Scout

Ranks and Insignia
Marine Corps ranks are based on Commonwealth Navy ranks.

The highest peacetime rank a commissioned officer can attain in the Marine Corps is Captain. Career progression in the force for Marine officers is possible well beyond the rank of Navy Captain. A Marine officer can be posted outside the Marine unit and progress up the ranks to the singular appointment of Chief of Defence Force. The highest rank an enlisted member can attain is Warrant Officer Class 1, but the highest appointment they can hold is the Namibian Defence Force Sergeant Major.

Commissioned officers

Non-commissioned officers/Other ranks

Gallery

External Videos

References

Military of Namibia
Marines
Military units and formations established in 2016
2016 establishments in Namibia